Joseph Hoare  (1709 – 26 May 1802) was a Welsh clergyman and Principal of Jesus College, Oxford, from 1768 to 1802.

The son of Joseph Hoare, from Cardiff, Wales, Hoare studied at Jesus College from 1727 (when he was 18), obtaining his BA in 1730 and his MA in 1733. He was a Prebendary of Westminster Abbey.  He was appointed Principal in 1768.  During his time as Principal, he donated £200 towards restoration of the college's Old Quadrangle. In 1798, he also subscribed £100 for the "prosecution of the [Napoleonic] war" and £21 for muskets and necessaries for the University corps.  He held the post of Principal for the third-longest time in the college's history. He died in 1802 after having been scratched by his cat. He bequeathed hundreds of volumes of books to the college library.

He was elected a Fellow of the Royal Society in May, 1753.

References

1709 births
1802 deaths
Clergy from Cardiff
Fellows of Jesus College, Oxford
Alumni of Jesus College, Oxford
Principals of Jesus College, Oxford
Fellows of the Royal Society
Canons of Westminster